Goran Jagodnik (born 23 May 1974) is a Slovenian former professional basketball player.

Professional career
During his journeyman career, Jagodnik played for numerous clubs in several countries, most notably with Polish team Prokom Trefl Sopot (four seasons) and Serbian team Hemofarm (two seasons). In his homeland, Jagodnik played with Hopsi Polzela and Union Olimpija.

On 3 March 2015, Union Olimpija announced that he had joined the club for training sessions, with an option of signing a deal until the rest of the season. Two days after that, he was added to the team's Adriatic League roster.

Slovenian national team
Jagodnik was a long-time member of the Slovenian national team, making his debut at EuroBasket 1997. He played at five more European Championships (1999, 2001, 2007, 2009 and 2011), as well as at the 2010 FIBA World Championship.

Career statistics

Euroleague statistics

|-
| align="left" | 2004–05
| align="left" | Prokom
| 18 || 18 || 28.0 || .386 || .315 || .826 || 6.0 || 1.1 || 1.5 || .3 || 14.8 || 12.8
|-
| align="left" | 2005–06
| align="left" | Prokom
| 14 || 11 || 28.5 || .350 || .363 || .760 || 6.3 || .9 || 1.8 || .1 || 15.1 || 11.6
|-
| align="left" | 2010–11
| align="left" | Olimpija
| 16 || 0 || 20.3 || .445 || .390 || .905 || 3.0 || .8 || .6 || .0 || 10.4 || 8.2
|-
| align="left" | Career
| align="left" |
| 48 || 29 || 25.7 || .386 || .349 || .826 || 5.1 || .9 || 1.3 || .2 || 13.4 || 10.9

References

External links

 Goran Jagodnik at aba-liga.com
 Goran Jagodnik at euroleague.net
 Goran Jagodnik at kzs.si
 Goran Jagodnik at legabasket.it
 Goran Jagodnik at plk.pl
 Goran Jagodnik at tblstat.net

1974 births
Living people
People from Postojna
Slovenian men's basketball players
Power forwards (basketball)
Small forwards
ABA League players
KD Hopsi Polzela players
Asseco Gdynia players
Basketball League of Serbia players
BC Dynamo Moscow players
Basketball Nymburk players
Slovenian expatriate basketball people in Russia
KK Hemofarm players
KK Olimpija players
KK Włocławek players
PBC Lokomotiv-Kuban players
Scafati Basket players
Slovenian expatriate basketball people in Italy
Slovenian expatriate basketball people in Serbia
Slovenian expatriate basketball people in Poland
Slovenian expatriate sportspeople in Russia
Slovenian expatriate basketball people in the Czech Republic
Slovenian expatriate basketball people in Turkey
KD Ilirija players
TED Ankara Kolejliler players
Türk Telekom B.K. players
2010 FIBA World Championship players